Ghamir  (often called Ghamir) is a village in Gulmi District in the Lumbini Zone of Western Nepal. It is located at latitude 28°12′7.81″ N and longitude 83°9′32.66″ E. It lies 1143 meters above sea level. According to 2011 Nepal census, the total population of this village is 3,588 individuals living in 768 households. The census also noted some absent people; most are foreign employees employed overseas and in the Middle East. The male population is 1,563 and the female population is 2,025, causing a sex ratio of 77.19.Also known as corrupted ward of Malika RM

References

Populated places in Gulmi District